Agro is an Australian puppet and media personality, operated by comedian and voice artist Jamie Dunn. He was especially prominent on Australian television in the 1990s due to his co-hosting opposite Ann-Maree Biggar and Terasa Livingstone of Agro's Cartoon Connection, a children's program that was aired from 1989 to 1997 on weekday mornings on the Seven Network.

Name and personality
The word "agro" (also spelled "aggro") is Australian slang for "aggression" or "aggravation". Agro is sometimes said to have the surname Vation, though the puppet is rarely credited with a surname.

Agro's humour tends to be adult, with much sexual suggestion, cursing and uninhibited behaviour. He has often appeared with an innocent-acting female offsider, who is subjected to mocking and innuendo. His pre-taped performances in shows intended for a juvenile or family audience were vetted before broadcast, but in the adult-oriented shows (and in the Christmas tapes of Agro's Cartoon Connection) his largely uncensored antics were given full rein. Unlike many characters, particularly children's puppets, Agro often broke the fourth wall, making reference, for example, to the facts that he was a puppet, that his limbs did not move, and that a hand was up his back. 

Agro is a fan of the Australian rugby league footballer Wally Lewis, writing and singing many songs about him. He is a patron of the Shandar Smith Foundation, a charity for children with cancer.

History
The original puppet was created by BTQ-7 employee Garry Rhodes, who was a floor manager at the time. Although it is often joked that he is made from a bathmat (Agro frequently describes himself as a "talking bathmat"), the Agro puppet was an altered vintage 1978 Fisher-Price puppet of Animal from The Muppet Show. Later, the producer of Agro's Cartoon Connection claimed that Agro had been "altered by the Red Cross", after Jim Henson's Muppets made a claim regarding copyright. It was Rhodes who coined the concept of "eating flies" and other naughty quirks that later continued as part of the puppet's character.

After a falling out with Seven led to Rhodes' resignation, several different operators were involved in working the puppet. Struggling songwriter Jamie Dunn was eventually hired by Seven as a permanent replacement after they received a song demo recorded by Dunn about Agro which included an impression of the character. It was Dunn who took the character to greater heights and created an iconic part of Australian television history. Dunn's marketing prowess resulted in the Agro concept becoming a lucrative career for him. Dunn has never appeared alongside Agro, as a typical ventriloquist might. When Agro appears on camera or on stage, Dunn is always hidden, often by furniture.

The Agro puppet eventually produced by Fisher-Price was unusual in its construction. The puppeteer could open and close the mouth, and could also manipulate the eyebrows via a plastic lever in the head. This allowed Dunn to create a sexually-suggestive leering expression, which he often used. The eyes and limbs do not move. In 2001 Channel Seven Productions enlisted puppeteer and puppet builder Warren Duxbury to rebuild Agro because the original Agro had deteriorated beyond repair. The new puppet was built for use on the short-lived revival of dating show Perfect Match that aired the following year. The nose of the new puppet was noticeably different from the old one.

After Agro's rise to fame there was some dispute between Rhodes and Jamie Dunn because Dunn attempted to claim creative ownership of the puppet. A court case loomed, but BTQ-7 and the parties involved reached a settlement that allowed Jamie Dunn to retain the rights. However, Agro officially belongs to Channel Seven. 

Apart from Perfect Match, Agro's on-camera roles became less frequent in the late 1990s and into the 2000s as Dunn's radio commitments grew and the novelty of the character wore off. When Agro performed on radio, Jamie Dunn would sit in the studio and provide the Agro voice without actually operating the puppet. Dunn aspired to become a show-business personality in his own right, and so in time he appeared in promotional material for the B105 FM Morning Crew as himself. He used the Agro character as a kind of alternative, more uninhibited personality (for example, when making prank telephone calls). The puppet itself was seldom seen during the 2000s. Dunn said at one point that Agro was "in a suitcase somewhere". In 2008 Agro appeared in promotional material for Zinc 96.

In March 2009, Agro returned to television screens in South East Queensland to promote a $7,000 cash giveaway on Radio Station 4BC. From August 2013, Agro started appearing on the Channel 7 program The Daily Edition, interacting with the panel and answering viewer questions.

In 2017, Agro appeared in several ads for "sellmycar.com.au", and has continued as the voice of the radio advertisement. In 2020 he appeared in several ads for Uber Eats. In 2021 Agro made a cameo appearance on the second episode of Holey Moley.

Career

Television host
Agro hosted the following Australian television shows:
 Boris' Breakfast Club (? – 1989)
 Wombat (1983–1990)
 Agro's Cartoon Connection (1989–1997)
 Super Sunday Show (aka Super Saturday Show)
 Perfect Match (2002 revival)

Agro was a guest host for Tonight Live with Steve Vizard on four occasions. He also appeared many times as a guest on Tonight Live.

Television appearances
Agro has also appeared as a guest on the following television shows:
 The Don Lane Show
 Everybody
 Hey Dad..!
 Home And Away
 Hey Hey It's Saturday
 Wheel of Fortune (often appearing as the partner and mouthpiece for Fat Cat on Celebrity Wheel of Fortune)
 Family Feud (with his "family" father Star, mother Ellie and younger brother Neville)
 The Main Event
 Talk With the Animals
 Concentration
 The Daily Edition

Agro has also appeared on a number of Australian telethons, particularly those that raise money for the Royal Children's Hospital, Brisbane. Agro has also occasionally appeared as a panel member on the Channel Seven Perth Telethon, but usually after 10 p.m.

Radio host
Agro's radio credits include:

 The Morning Crew (1990–2005), B105 FM's breakfast show. Agro performed prank telephone calls and also presented a segment Agro to the Rescue, in which he would provide money or resources to a family or individual in trouble. Eventually the Agro performances were credited to Jamie Dunn, and the Agro character was marginalised.
 The Zinc Morning Zoo (2006–), with Ian Calder and Courtney Burns on Sunshine Coast FM radio station Zinc 96.

Merchandising
At his height of popularity extensive Agro merchandising included four recorded studio albums (of which three were nominated for ARIA Awards), a Game Boy game (Agro Soar), an arcade game (Agro's Fantastic Video Game), and a range of other merchandise including action figures, snap cards, stickers, lunchboxes, and children's clothing, and annual showbags at the Sydney Royal Easter Show. For a period of time, an Agro ice cream similar to Bubble O' Bill was produced by Pauls.

Discography

Studio albums

Singles

Awards and nominations

ARIA Music Awards

Logie Awards

He also received a Penguin Award for "Best Presenter of Light Entertainment".

References

Notes

Partridge 2006

External links
 

Australian radio personalities
Australian television personalities
Children's television characters
Puppets
Australian mascots